The Reer Manyo are confederacy of clans based in the southern coast of Somalia, primarily in the cities of Mogadishu and Merca and the towns and villages between them.

Etymology 
Reer (Somali: Family) and Manyo (Somali: Sea), the etymological meaning of this clan confederacy immediately shows they are a group of people dedicated to the sea.

Clan Tree 
The Reer Manyo are made up of 6 clan groups, where 4 are found in Mogadishu (primarily in the Abdiaziz District, Shingani District, Hamar Weyne District, Karan District and Hamar Jajab district) and 4 are found in Merca and its surrounding villages (2 clans are found in both Mogadishu and Merca).  The clans that make up Reer Manyo are:

 Reer Macow (also known as Ba Muqtar)
 Reer Shaawis
 Reer Omar
 Reer 'Aafi
 Reer Haaji( also known as shiiqaal jaziira)
 Reer Hassan( also known as shiiqaal aw xasan)

References 

Society of Somalia
Ethnic groups in Somalia
Somali clans